Igor Kunitsyn was the defending champion but decided not to participate.

Rainer Schüttler claimed the title. He won against Teymuraz Gabashvili 7–6(8–6), 4–6, 6–4 in the final.

Seeds

Draw

Finals

Top half

Bottom half

References
 Main draw
 Qualifying draw

Astana Cup - Singles
2011 Singles